The Choris Peninsula is a cape in Alaska. It is located in the east of Kotzebue Sound on the Chukchi Sea coast.

The Choris Peninsula is a small headland pointing southwards. Chamisso Island lies off its southern tip.

It was named in 1816 by Lt. Otto von Kotzebue IRN, for Louis Choris, a member of his expedition.

See also
 Chamisso Wilderness

References

 

Headlands of Alaska
Landforms of Northwest Arctic Borough, Alaska